The 1920 Baylor Bears football team was an American football team that represented Baylor University as a member of the Southwest Conference (SWC) during the 1920 college football season. In its first season under head coach Frank Bridges, the team compiled a 4–4–1 record and was outscored by a total of 89 to 65.

Schedule

References

Baylor
Baylor Bears football seasons
Baylor Bears football